Ox is an Argentine steakhouse in Portland, Oregon's Eliot neighborhood, in the United States.

History
Greg and Gabrielle Denton opened Ox in 2012. A "spillover space" called Whey Bar opened later in the year.

In 2015, a ventilation malfunction filled Ox with smoke and forced an evacuation. The restaurant released a cookbook in 2016. Ox began taking reservations in 2019. Kurt Huffman owns at least a 20 percent stake in the restaurant, as of 2020.

Reception
Ox was named Restaurant of the Year by The Oregonian in 2013. Ox received honorable mention in the Best Restaurant, Best SteakHouse, and Best Chowder categories in Willamette Week annual "Best of Portland Readers' Poll" in 2015. The restaurant ranked third in the Best Steak House category in 2017. The Dentons were nominated for Portland's Chef of the Year by Eater Portland Eater Awards in 2016. The duo won in the Best Chef Northwest category by the James Beard Foundation Awards in 2017.

See also
 Argentine cuisine
 Hispanics and Latinos in Portland, Oregon
 James Beard Foundation Award: 2010s

References

External links

 
 Ox at the Food Network
 Ox at Frommer's
 Ox at Lonely Planet
 Ox at Portland Monthly
 Ox at Thrillist
 Ox at Zagat
 Ox at Zomato

2012 establishments in Oregon
Argentine restaurants
Eliot, Portland, Oregon
Latin American restaurants in Portland, Oregon
Northeast Portland, Oregon
Restaurants established in 2012
Steakhouses in Portland, Oregon